The HSL-Zuid, is a 125 kilometre-long (78 miles) Dutch high-speed railway line running between the Amsterdam metropolitan area and the Belgian border, with a branch to Breda, North Brabant. Together with the Belgian HSL 4 it forms the Schiphol–Antwerp high-speed railway. Originally scheduled to be in service by 2007, the first public operations began on 7 September 2009, after a ceremony on 6 September.

Intercity Direct operates between Amsterdam and Breda, for the time being with conventional Intercity carriages and TRAXX locomotives. On 13 December 2009 Thalys began services from Amsterdam to Paris and Brussels on the HSL-Zuid. On 4 April 2018 the first scheduled Eurostar connected Amsterdam to London via the HSL-Zuid.

Talks about a high-speed line between Amsterdam and the Belgian border started under Prime Minister Joop den Uyl (1973–1977); work began during Wim Kok's first term (1998–2002). The Rijkswaterstaat, a government agency under the authority of the Ministry of Transport and Water Management, was responsible for the organisation of the project. The Government of the Netherlands awarded the country's largest ever public-private partnership (PPP) contract to the consortium Infraspeed until 2030; it is responsible for design, construction, financing and maintenance. The line features state-of-the-art technology, including ETCS L2 train control systems provided by Siemens AG and Alcatel (activities now part of Thales), and will be an ERTMS 2.3.0 Corridor.

Route

Between Amsterdam and Schiphol (Westtak Ringspoorbaan), and around Rotterdam, high speed trains operate on the existing line.

South of Schiphol the dedicated high speed tracks begin, parallelling the existing railway line until Nieuw-Vennep. The line then branches off eastwards, continuing along the west side of Roelofarendsveen and Hoogmade and entering a tunnel east of Leiderdorp.  This tunnel was built to protect the character of the Groene Hart region. North of Zoetermeer the train line leaves the tunnel west of Hazerswoude; it subsequently passes to the east of Benthuizen, and on an elevated track east of Zoetermeer, then back on the surface between Berkel en Rodenrijs and Bergschenhoek, and after a tunnel, joins the existing line again north of Rotterdam.

Trains run briefly on existing tracks for a few kilometres before entering the high speed line again. At Barendrecht the two tracks cross each other and the trains begin left-hand running as in Belgium, France and the United Kingdom. From here the line runs next to the existing railway as well as the Betuweroute, continuing through the Hoekse Waard area, bypassing Dordrecht. South of Dordrecht, the line runs next to the A16 motorway with a branch spurring off to the city of Breda. South of Breda, the line again follows the motorway towards Antwerp in northern Belgium. At the Belgian border, it connects to HSL 4, which carries on to Antwerp, with an existing line from Antwerp to Brussels.

Services

Since the opening of the HSL-Zuid, the number of trains has been expanded over time.

Domestic trains
On 7 September 2009, operator NS International started a domestic train service between Amsterdam and Rotterdam, weekdays only, 1 train hourly with TRAXX-locomotives and ICR-carriages running at 160 km/h maximum. Over time, this service has been expanded. On 12 April 2010, service was expanded to Saturday and Sunday. On 4 October 2010, the frequency was doubled to 2 trains hourly. On 3 April 2011, this service was extended to Breda. This service is called Intercity Direct, until 2013 Fyra. Although a more intensive service was planned initially, this is not possible due to the V250 rolling stock problem.

 In service as of April 2014, 2 trains per hour: Amsterdam Centraal – Schiphol Airport – Rotterdam Centraal – Breda
 In service as of December 2016, 2 trains per hour: Amsterdam Centraal – Schiphol Airport – Rotterdam
 In service as of April 2017, 2 trains per hour: Den Haag Centraal – Rotterdam Centraal – Breda – Eindhoven

International trains

Benelux train
The "Benelux train", in the Netherlands also known as Intercity Brussel, which existed before the Fyra, has been put into service again since the latter's demise, albeit under a renewed livery. It is a conventional InterCity train running between Amsterdam and Brussels-South using the Schiphol-Antwerp high-speed railway with reverse in Breda. These trains run every hour in both directions between Rotterdam and Brussels, serving either The Hague (4 times per day) or Schiphol and Amsterdam CS north of Rotterdam.

Benelux train service to The Hague will however be cancelled starting January 2022. These trains will be redirected to Amsterdam over the HSL-Zuid, increasing the Amsterdam – Breda – Brussels service to sixteen trains per day in each direction instead of twelve but obliging travellers between Brussels and The Hague to change trains in Rotterdam or in Breda, albeit with a couple of minutes' reduction in total travel time.

Stations served:
 Amsterdam CS (except services to/from The Hague)
 Schiphol (except services to/from The Hague)
 The Hague HS (only services to/from The Hague)
 Rotterdam CS
 Breda
 Noorderkempen (Brecht)
 Antwerpen-Centraal
 Antwerpen-Berchem
 Mechelen
 Brussels Airport
 Brussels North
 Brussels Central
 Brussels South

Thalys
Thalys runs 11 times a day on the HSL-Zuid with speeds up to 300 km/h. After the failure of V250 and Fyra International, Thalys frequency was expanded:

 In service as of November 2021, 11 trains per day: Amsterdam Centraal – Schiphol – Rotterdam Centraal – Antwerp – Brussels Midi – Paris Nord
 In service as of March 2022, 1 trains per day: Amsterdam Centraal – Schiphol – Rotterdam Centraal – Antwerp – Brussels Midi – Paris CDG Airport - Marne-la-Vallée Disneyland
Winter seasonal service: 1 trains per week Amsterdam Centraal – Schiphol – Rotterdam Centraal – Antwerp – Brussels Midi - Chambéry - Bourg-Saint-Maurice

Eurostar

Eurostar runs 2 times a day on the HSL-Zuid with speeds up to 300 km/h. Since late 2020 the Eurostar service is operated without change in Brussels due to a treaty with the British government, before the treaty passengers to the UK needed to disembark in Brussels and undergo customs screenings.

 In service as of December 2021, 2 trains per day (before Covid19 up to 4 trains): Amsterdam Centraal – Rotterdam Centraal –  Brussels Midi/South – Lille Europe - London St Pancras Int'l

Fyra
Fyra International was an international high speed train service operated with V250 rolling stock between Amsterdam Centraal – Schiphol Airport – Rotterdam Centraal – Antwerp – Brussels, 10 times daily. Due to intensive problems with V250, this service only ran for forty days, between 8 December 2012 and 17 January 2013. The trains were eventually returned to Ansaldobreda.

Travel times

The new line shortened travel times for international and domestic services departing from Amsterdam.
 From Amsterdam to Rotterdam (70 km or 44 mi): 43 minutes (previously 58 minutes)
 From Amsterdam to Breda (113 km or 70 mi): 59 minutes (previously 1 hour and 44 minutes)
 From Amsterdam to Antwerp (164.5 km or 102 mi): 1 hour and 10 minutes (previously 2 hours)
 From Amsterdam to Brussels (212 km or 132 mi): 1 hour and 44 minutes (previously 2 hours and 40 minutes)
 From Amsterdam to Paris (531 km or 330 mi): 3 hours and 13 minutes (previously 4 hours and 11 minutes)

From Roosendaal however the travel times have become longer.
 From Roosendaal to Brussels (82 km or 50 mi): 1 hour and 16 minutes not including the change of trains in Breda (previously 1 hour and 8 minutes)

Thalys reported that its trains would start using the line from December 2009, with Paris to Amsterdam journeys being 3 hours and 45 minutes and Brussels to Amsterdam journeys being 2 hours and 23 minutes, on account of a plan to gradually increase the line speed, with the same trains in June taking 3 hours and 18 minutes and 1 hour and 58 minutes. Nowadays trains travel from Paris and Brussels to Amsterdam in respectively 3 hours and 13 minutes and 1 hour and 44 minutes.

Fares and tickets
On the domestic Intercity Direct services (running from Amsterdam to Schiphol, Rotterdam and Breda) all regular Nederlandse Spoorwegen (NS) tickets are valid. A supplement (Dutch: toeslag) is required only for travel between Schiphol and Rotterdam. This costs €2.60 one-way in rush hour, and €1.56 outside rush hour. Domestic tickets cannot be used on the international Thalys trains where reservations are mandatory.

Technical problems

ETCS
Initially the HSL-Zuid route supported speeds of up to 160 km/h on both the southern Rotterdam to Breda and the northern Rotterdam to Schiphol section of the line. This was because ETCS Level 2 had not commenced operations and Level 1 was still in use. Various reliability issues prevented the use of Level 2 for sustainable commercial service. Another issue was that the updated ETCS software of the Bombardier TRAXX locomotives was not certified for ETCS Level 2 operation.  Railway Gazette reported in April 2011 that certification had been achieved and indeed Level 2 operations began on the southern section in May 2011 with Fyra services running at up to 160 km/h and Thalys at up to 300 km/h. Level 2 went into operation on the northern part of the line in September 2011 and Thalys trains were then able to commence 300 km/h operations on that section. The V250 Fyra trains were hoped to enter service in December 2011 and indeed trial service (without passengers) began using first one, then two trains. As of March 2012 driver and train crew instruction runs were taking place with scheduled, non-passenger-carrying V250 interleaved between the passenger services and it was expected that these units would begin passenger operation in April 2012. The ETCS systems of wayside (Thales) and onboard (Traxx: Bombardier; Thalys & V250: Ansaldo STS) are interworking satisfactorily. With changes in the NS concession arrangements from 2015, the HSL service was combined with the national concession. The amount of Traxx locomotives and Prio carriages will be increased over the coming years as a stopgap measure until new intercity trains (foreseen in 2021/2022) will enter service. As a first step NS announced in December 2013 that they had placed an order at Bombardier for 19 Traxx locomotives.

V250
The V250 trains were ordered at the Italian train manufacturer AnsaldoBreda and were delivered in mid-2009. On 31 May 2013, the Belgian railway company NMBS/SNCB decided to stop the Fyra project and refused delivery of the trains it had ordered. On 3 June 2013, the Dutch national railway company NS announced that it had made a similar evaluation, and expressed its desire to stop with the V250 project. The Dutch department of finance agreed, and recommended that NS do "everything in its power" to get a refund from AnsaldoBreda. At a press conference on 6 June 2013, the manufacturer claimed that the trains had been handled poorly by running the trains too fast (at maximum commercial speed of 250 km/h) under snow conditions. AnsaldoBreda has also threatened to sue the railways for the damage to its reputation.

On 17 March 2014 NS announced a settlement with AnsaldoBreda had been reached. The 9 NS trains will be returned to AnsaldoBreda for a refund of 125 million euros, 88 million euros less than originally paid. NS will receive an additional compensation for each resold unit to a maximum of 21 million euros. In May 2014, NMBS/SNCB, AnsaldoBreda and its controlling company Finmeccanica announced that they reached a settlement that confirms the cancellation of the train orders and includes the payment of 2.5 million euros to NMBS/SNCB.

Future
In October 2010, Deutsche Bahn (DB) announced plans to directly connect Amsterdam and Rotterdam with London, using the Channel Tunnel. This proposal would see services from London formed of a pair of DB's Class 407 international ICE units, which would then divide in Brussels, with one train to Frankfurt and the other to Amsterdam. At approximately the same time, Eurostar also announced proposals to run services direct to Amsterdam, which would use its planned new e320 trains, and would be capable of operating on the infrastructure of the Dutch classic network as well as the HSL-Zuid. The DB’s plan has been buried since.

See also
High-speed rail in Belgium
High-speed rail in the Netherlands
High-speed rail in Europe

References

External links

HSA website
HSL-Zuid, the Dutch TGV line
Photos of construction work, from 2001 till present 

High-speed railway lines in Belgium
High-speed railway lines in the Netherlands
Railway tunnels in the Netherlands
Railway lines opened in 2009
Railway lines in North Holland
Railway lines in South Holland
Railway lines in North Brabant
Transport in Amsterdam
Transport in Breda
Rail transport in Rotterdam